The Symphony No. 4 in F major, Op. 86 by Louis Spohr has the title "Die Weihe der Töne," meaning "The Consecration of Sound," and is a programmatic work based on the poem of the same name by Carl Pfeiffer. It was composed in 1832 and published in 1834.

Movements 

The symphony is divided into four movements with the following tempo markings:

An alternative division of the work is sometimes given, more clearly illustrating the work's programmatic nature:

Nos. 1 and 2 constitute the first movement, 3 and 4 the second, 5 and 6 the third, and 7 and 8 the fourth.

Recordings 

The symphony has been recorded by Howard Griffiths and the NDR Radiophilharmonie, as well as Howard Shelley with the Orchestra della Svizzera Italiana. A recording by Alfred Walter and the Budapest Symphony Orchestra on the Naxos label is also available.

Notes

Compositions by Louis Spohr
Compositions in F major